These are the Australian Country number-one albums of 2020, per the ARIA Charts.

See also
2020 in music
List of number-one albums of 2020 (Australia)

References

2020
Australia country albums
Number-one country albums